Polar Biology is a monthly peer-reviewed scientific journal covering the biology of the polar regions. It is published by Springer Science+Business Media. According to the Journal Citation Reports, the journal has a 2015 impact factor of 1.711.

References

External links 
 

Biology journals
Ecology journals
Publications established in 1983
Monthly journals
English-language journals